Kim Sae-ron (born July 31, 2000) is a South Korean actress. She began her career when she was nine years old and became a popular child star through the films A Brand New Life (2009) and The Man From Nowhere (2010). As Kim reached her teenage years, she was cast in more leading roles, notably in the film A Girl at My Door (2014). She has also starred in television drama series, including Can You Hear My Heart (2011), The Queen's Classroom (2013) and Hi! School-Love On (2014). Her first adult lead role was in the television drama Secret Healer (2016).

Film

Television series

Web series

Hosting

Music videos

References

South Korean filmographies
Actress filmographies